The 1902–03 Rugby Union County Championship was the 15th edition of England's premier rugby union club competition at the time.

Durham won the competition for the third time defeating Kent in the final.

Final

See also
 English rugby union system
 Rugby union in England

References

Rugby Union County Championship
County Championship (rugby union) seasons